Moree may refer to:

Moree, New South Wales, a large town in New South Wales, Australia
Moree, Ghana, a village in Akanland, Ghana
Moree Plains Shire, a local government area in New South Wales, Australia
Moree Airport, the airport for Moree, New South Wales, Australia
Pieter Moree, mathematician